King Tut Drive-In is a drive-in American and barbecue restaurant located on North Eisenhower Drive in Beckley, West Virginia.

History and description
King Tut's Drive-In was established in 1945 by its namesake the Tutweiller family who transferred ownership of the restaurant to the family of current owner Dave McKay a decade later in 1955. McKay, who used to work at the restaurant making pizza for 25¢ an hour, operated the restaurant with his brother Jeff for a while until the latter moved to Maryland.
The restaurant includes an awning over the parking area, a building that houses the kitchen and a large marquee at the front of the parking lot that serves as the menu. Typical of drive-in restaurants, the servers (called "curb girls" by McKay) fill orders and bring food out to the customer's cars.

On September 25, 2020, the restaurant announced that it would be closing temporarily due to the COVID-19 pandemic. It re-opened almost 2 weeks later on October 8.

Menu
The restaurant's menu is "large" and serves breakfast, lunch and dinner including hoagies, sandwiches, pot roast, chicken livers and swiss steak with their most popular items being the barbecue, hot dogs, specialty salads and pizza. Desert items include a root-beer float, milkshakes and three kinds of pie (apple, coconut and either chocolate or cherry cream).

References

Beckley, West Virginia
Restaurants in West Virginia
1945 establishments in the United States
Restaurants established in 1945
Drive-in restaurants
Barbecue restaurants in the United States